Mário José dos Santos Júnior (born September 10, 1979 in Cubatão, São Paulo) is a male race walker from Brazil. He competed for his native country in two consecutive Summer Olympics, starting in 2004 (Athens, Greece).

He won the 50 km section of the 2012 South American Race Walking Championships with a time of 4:12:52 hours.

Achievements

References

sports-reference

1979 births
Living people
Brazilian male racewalkers
Athletes (track and field) at the 2003 Pan American Games
Athletes (track and field) at the 2007 Pan American Games
Athletes (track and field) at the 2004 Summer Olympics
Athletes (track and field) at the 2008 Summer Olympics
Athletes (track and field) at the 2016 Summer Olympics
Olympic athletes of Brazil
Pan American Games athletes for Brazil
Sportspeople from São Paulo (state)
World Athletics Championships athletes for Brazil
Pan American Games medalists in athletics (track and field)
Pan American Games silver medalists for Brazil
Medalists at the 2003 Pan American Games
21st-century Brazilian people
People from Cubatão